The RIM-900 was one of the first wireless data devices, marketed as a two-way pager. It operated on the Mobitex network. It was a clam shell device that could fit on a belt.  It had a small QWERTY keyboard for sending and receiving email and interactive messages. 

The product was introduced as Inter@ctive Paging in 1996 by Research in Motion and RAM Mobile Data.

References 

Personal digital assistants
Pagers
Products introduced in 1996
900